Charleston is a city in, and the county seat of, Coles County, Illinois, United States. The population was 17,286, as of the 2020 census.  The city is home to Eastern Illinois University and has close ties with its neighbor, Mattoon. Both are principal cities of the Charleston–Mattoon Micropolitan Statistical Area.

History

Native Americans lived in the Charleston area for thousands of years before the first European settlers arrived. With the great tallgrass prairie to the west, beech-maple forests to the east, and the Embarras River and Wabash Rivers between, the Charleston area provided semi-nomadic Indians access to a variety of resources. Indians may have deliberately set the "wildfires" which maintained the local mosaic of prairie and oak–hickory forest. Streams with names such as 'Indian Creek' and 'Kickapoo Creek' mark the sites of former Indian settlements. One village is said to have been located south of Fox Ridge State Park near a deposit of flint.

The early history of settlement in the area was marked by uneasy co-existence between Indians and European settlers. Some settlers lived peacefully with the natives, but conflict arose in the 1810s and 1820s. After Indians allegedly harassed surveying crews, an escalating series of poorly documented skirmishes occurred between Indians, settlers, and the Illinois Rangers. Two pitched battles (complete with cannon on one side) took place just south of Charleston along "the hills of the Embarrass," near the entrance to Lake Charleston park. These conflicts did not slow American settlement, and Indian history in Coles County effectively ended when all natives were expelled by law from Illinois after the 1832 Black Hawk War. With the grudging exception of Indian wives, the last natives were driven out by the 1840s.

First settled by Benjamin Parker in 1826, Charleston was named for Charles Morton, its first postmaster. The city was established in 1831, but not incorporated until 1865. When Abraham Lincoln's father moved to a farm on Goosenest Prairie south of Charleston in 1831, Lincoln helped him move, then left to start his own homestead at New Salem in Sangamon County. Lincoln was a frequent visitor to the Charleston area, though he likely spent more time at the Coles County courthouse than at the home of his father and stepmother. One of the famous Lincoln–Douglas debates was held in Charleston on September 18, 1858, and is now the site of the Coles County fairgrounds and a small museum. Lincoln's last visit was in 1859, when the future President visited his stepmother and his father's grave.

Although Illinois was a solidly pro-Union, anti-slavery state, Coles County was settled by many Southerners with pro-slavery sentiments. In 1847, the county was divided when prominent local citizens offered refuge to a family of escaped slaves brought from Kentucky by Gen. Robert Matson. Abe Lincoln, by then a young railroad lawyer, appeared in the Coles County Courthouse to argue for the return of the escaped slaves under the Fugitive Slave Act in a case known as Matson v. Ashmore. As in the rest of the nation, this long-simmering debate finally broke out into violence during the American Civil War.  On March 28, 1864 a riot—or perhaps a small battle—erupted in downtown Charleston when armed Confederate sympathizers known as Copperheads arrived in town to attack half-drunk Union soldiers preparing to return to their regiment.

In 1895, the Eastern Illinois State Normal School was established in Charleston, which later became Eastern Illinois University. This led to lasting resentment in nearby Mattoon, which had originally led the campaign to locate the proposed teaching school in Coles County.  A Mattoon newspaper printed a special edition announcing the decision with the derisive headline "Catfish Town Gets It."

Thomas Lincoln's log cabin has been restored and is open to the public as the Lincoln Log Cabin State Historic Site, 8 mi. south of Charleston. The Lincoln farm is maintained as a living history museum where historical re-enactors depict life in 1840s Illinois. Thomas and Sarah Bush Lincoln are buried in the nearby Shiloh Cemetery.

On May 26, 1917, a tornado ripped through Charleston, killing 38 and wounding many more along with destroying 220 homes.

Geography

Climate 
The data below were taken from 1893 through January 2020, when this chart was made. They were accessed through the Western Regional Climate Center (WRCC).

Demographics

As of the 2020 census there were 17,286 people, 7,847 households, and 3,850 families residing in the city. The racial makeup of the city was 79.65% White, 8.39% African American, 0.27% Native American, 2.54% Asian, 0.13% Pacific Islander, 3.88% from other races, and 5.13% from two or more races. Hispanic or Latino of any race were 5.84% of the population.

There were 7,847 households, out of which 28.55% had children under the age of 18 living with them, 33.06% were married couples living together, 12.18% had a female householder with no husband present, and 50.94% were non-families. 36.05% of all households were made up of individuals, and 9.57% had someone living alone who was 65 years of age or older. The average household size was 2.68 and the average family size was 2.13.

The city's age distribution consisted of 12.7% under the age of 18, 32.5% from 18 to 24, 24.6% from 25 to 44, 18.4% from 45 to 64, and 11.7% who were 65 years of age or older. The median age was 27.7 years. For every 100 females, there were 91.4 males. For every 100 females age 18 and over, there were 90.9 males.

The median income for a household in the city was $41,436, and the median income for a family was $52,521. Males had a median income of $24,609 versus $16,650 for females. The per capita income for the city was $23,901. About 16.8% of families and 27.3% of the population were below the poverty line, including 24.5% of those under age 18 and 5.7% of those age 65 or over.

Economy 
Charleston is home to Eastern Illinois University, which has roughly 8,600 undergraduate and graduate students. Additionally, Eastern Illinois hosts the Illinois High School Association's Girls Badminton, Journalism, and Girls and Boys Track and Field State Finals.

The establishment of an enterprise zone on the northern edge of Charleston has helped attract some manufacturing and industrial jobs, including Vesuvius USA, ITW Hi-Cone, and Dietzgen Corporation.

Jimmy John Liautaud founded the first Jimmy John's restaurant in Charleston in 1983, occupying premises near the corner of Fourth Street and Lincoln Avenue.

Arts and Culture 
Charleston is home to the annual Coles County Fair, which typically runs for a week in the summer. The fair includes animal showings, carnival rides and attractions, a demolition derby, and more. The fair is held at the fairgrounds located at 603 W Madison Ave.

Museums and Libraries 

 Charleston Carnegie Public Library
 EIU Tarble Arts Center
 Doudna Fine Arts Center
 Lincoln Douglas Debate Museum
 Five Mile House

Parks and Recreation 
Charleston has seven parks (one of which is a state park) and six trails, only one of which is not part of Lake Charleston (the Lincoln Prairie Grass Trail).

Lake Charleston 
Lake Charleston lies approximately two miles (3km) southeast of the city center. Fishing and boating are allowed, although there is a no-wake regulation.

List of Parks 

 Fox Ridge State Park 
 Morton Park
 Sister City Park
 Kiwanis Park
 North Park
 VFW Way Park
 Reasor Park

Parks and Recreation Department 
Charleston's Parks and Recreation Department offers a variety of services, including before & after school clubs, a day club, dog training classes, and children sports leagues.

Government

City Manager 
Charleston is run under a City Manager style of government, where the City Manager is the city's chief administrative officer and oversees the City Council. The City Manager is an appointed position. As of September 18, 2003, R. Scott Smith, a former Parks & Recreation director, officially became Charleston's City Manager after serving as interim manager since August 9, 2003 and continues to hold that position as of January 2022.

City Council and Mayor 
The City Council is an elected legislative body of the City of Charleston, of which the mayor is a part. They make policy decisions based on recommendations and information from the City Manager. Brandon Combs was appointed mayor of Charleston June 30, 2015 and continues to hold the office.

Education
Charleston is served by Charleston Community Unit School District 1, one of three school districts located in the county of Coles. The district itself is composed of six schools: Ashmore Elementary School (PreK-4), Mark Twain Elementary School (PreK and K), Carl Sandburg Elementary School (1-3), Jefferson Elementary School (4-6), Charleston Middle School (7-8), and Charleston High School (9-12).

Eastern Illinois University is a public university in Charleston and has served the community since 1895.

Lakeview College of Nursing has a campus located in Charleston.

Media 
Charleston is served by the JG-TC (Journal Gazette & Times Courier) local newspaper and Eastern Illinois University's daily newspaper The Daily Eastern News

Infrastructure 
Illinois Route 16 serves as the city's main east-west road, titled Lincoln Ave. within city limits.

Highways 

 Illinois Route 16 (Lincoln Ave.)
 Illinois Route 130 (18th St./Olive Ave.)
 Illinois Route 316 (Madison Ave./State St.)

Airport 
Established in 1953, the airport received commercial service until 2000, and now serves as a public general aviation facility.

Mass Transit 
Charleston is serviced by two main transit routes: the Charleston Zip Line run by Dial-A-Ride which services the general city area, and the Panther Shuttle, which mainly services the Eastern Illinois University campus. The Zip Line has been suspended until further notice due to COVID-19.

Rail 
Charleston does not receive direct passenger rail service, however Amtrak's Illini and Saluki and City of New Orleans routes stop in neighboring Mattoon. Freight-wise, Charleston was serviced by the Eastern Illinois Railroad, which was acquired by the Decatur & Eastern Illinois Railroad, which now services businesses in the region.

Healthcare 
There is a Walk-In Clinic located within the city itself.

Notable people 

 Kim Chizevsky-Nicholls, IFBB pro bodybuilder
 Ronald W. Davis, director of the Stanford Genome Technology Center, biochemist, geneticist
 Frank K. Dunn, Chief Justice of the Illinois Supreme Court
 Jim Edgar, governor of Illinois from 1990 to 1998, was raised in Charleston and graduated from Eastern Illinois University
 Jeff Gossett, longtime journeyman punter who played in the NFL for 16 years
 George Hilton Jones III, historian and author
 Joshua Scott Jones, Big Machine Records recording artists (country music) and one-half of the duo "Steel Magnolia"
 Tom Koch, longtime comedy writer for Mad Magazine and Bob and Ray
 David Lamb, musician and songwriter for Brown Bird; born in Charleston in 1977
 James John Liautaud, founder of the Jimmy John's restaurant franchise
 Lee Lynch, Illinois newspaper editor and politician
 Rex Morgan, basketball player
 Marty Pattin, pitcher for the California Angels, Seattle Pilots/Milwaukee Brewers, Boston Red Sox and Kansas City Royals
 Curtis Price, the Principal of the Royal Academy of Music and a professor of music at the University of London; was raised in Charleston
 Zeke Rosebraugh, pitcher for the Pittsburgh Pirates; born in Charleston
 Stan Royer, former Major League Baseball player. Graduated from Charleston High School
 Willis R. Shaw, Illinois state senator; born in Charleston
 Larry Stuffle, member of the Illinois House of Representatives from 1977 to 1985. He was born in Charleston and represented the area in the Illinois House of Representatives.
 Gregg Toland, cinematographer of Citizen Kane and Wuthering Heights (for which he won an Oscar), was born and raised in Charleston.

References

External links

Charleston Tourism Office
Eastern Illinois University
Charleston CUSD #1
Brief history of Charleston and Mattoon at Genealogy Trails
1994 reenactment of Lincoln-Douglas Debate in Charleston televised by C-SPAN (Debate preview and Debate review)
 

 
Cities in Illinois
Cities in Coles County, Illinois
County seats in Illinois
Populated places established in 1831